Jaya Savige is an Australian poet.

Biography 

Born in Sydney (1978), Savige grew up in Queensland, on Bribie Island and in Brisbane, boarding at St Joseph's College, Nudgee. He attended the University of Queensland, where, after withdrawing from an LLB/BCom, he received a University Medal for his B.A. honours thesis in English on Shakespeare and Keats. In 2006 he completed an MPhil under the supervision of Bronwyn Lea.

His first collection of poetry, Latecomers (2005), was awarded the NSW Premier's Kenneth Slessor Prize for Poetry and the Thomas Shapcott Poetry Prize. From 2006 to 2011, he was poetry editor of the Australian Literary Review, the literary supplement to The Australian newspaper. Since 2010, he has been poetry editor for The Australian.

As of 2008, Savige was a Gates Scholar at the University of Cambridge, Christ's College. His second collection of poems, Surface to Air, was published in late 2011. Jaya Savige is a lecturer in English and head of creative writing at New College of the Humanities.

Published books 

 Change Machine (University of Queensland Press, 2020, 
Maze Bright (Vagabond Press, 2014)
Surface to Air (University of Queensland Press, 2011)
 Latecomers (University of Queensland Press, 2005)

Awards 

 Queensland Premier's Award for a work of State Significance and the Judith Wright Calanthe Award for a Poetry Collection, 2021, shortlisted for Change Machine
NSW Premier's Kenneth Slessor Prize for Poetry, 2021, shortlisted for Change Machine 
The Age Poetry Book of the Year, 2012, shortlisted for "Surface to Air"
 West Australian Premier's Poetry Prize, 2012, shortlisted for "Surface to Air"
 ALS Gold Medal, 2012, longlisted for "Surface to Air"
 NSW Premier's Kenneth Slessor Prize for Poetry, 2006, winner for Latecomers
 Dame Mary Gilmore Prize, 2006, highly commended for Latecomers
 Judith Wright Calanthe Award for poetry, 2006, shortlisted for Latecomers
 [Judith Wright Prize], 2006, shortlisted for Latecomers
 Arts Queensland Thomas Shapcott Poetry Prize, 2004, winner for Latecomers
 Arts Queensland Val Vallis Award, 2003, winner for Skirmish Point

References

External links 
 Jaya Savige's Website
 Jaya Savige's Author Page at University of Queensland Press.
 Interview with Jaya Savige at Gates Cambridge Scholars.
 Three poems from Surface to Air (2011) by Jaya Savige at PN Review.
 One poem from Surface to Air (2011) at Newcastle Art Gallery.
 Article by Jaya Savige on contemporary Australian Poetry, as poetry editor of Australian Literary Review (2010)
 One poem from Latecomers (2005), with audio, at The Red Room Company.
 One poem, since uncollected, at hutt (2004).
 Jaya Savige's portal page at about.me

Australian poets
Writers from Sydney
University of Queensland alumni
1978 births
Living people